The Nika Award for Best Supporting Performance is given annually by the Russian Academy of Cinema Arts and Science and presented at the Nika Awards.

In the following lists, the titles and names in bold with a light blue background are the winners and recipients respectively; those not in bold are the nominees.

Winners and nominees

1980s

1990s

2000s

References

External links
 

Nika Awards
Film acting awards
Film awards for supporting actress
Lists of films by award